Clipper Magazine is a local, regional and national direct-mail advertising company, with 435 local editions and specialty publications in 22 states each mailing 6 to 12 times annually to more than 23 million homes. In addition to the Clipper Magazine brand, it publishes under the brands Local Flavor, Mint Magazine, Reach, Great Deals Magazine, Get1Free and Market Magazine as well as various specialty publications.

The company started in 1983 as a student business at Franklin & Marshall College, in Lancaster, Pennsylvania, by Steve Zuckerman, Ian Ruzow and Bob Zuckerman. Clipper Magazine was acquired in November 2015.

Naming rights
In 2004, Clipper Magazine purchased the naming rights of Clipper Magazine Stadium, home of the Lancaster Barnstormers of the Atlantic League of Professional Baseball, for $2.5 million over ten years. The baseball park is located at 650 North Prince Street in the Northwest Corridor neighborhood of Lancaster, Pennsylvania. This agreement was extended in 2013 through the 2019 season.

In November 2015, Clipper Magazine was purchased for an undisclosed amount by Valassis Communications, a Michigan-based direct-mail company. Valassis acquired Clipper Magazine in an effort to accelerate its expansion into local business markets. 

In April 2022, Clipper Magazine was acquired by AmatoMartin, a privately held investment company focused on investing in exceptional teams operating in the media, marketing services & digital transformation sectors.

References

External links
 
 Local Flavor

Publishing companies established in 1983
Mass media in Lancaster, Pennsylvania
1983 establishments in Pennsylvania